The Zero Hour is a 1939 American drama film directed by Sidney Salkow.

Plot
A kindly theatrical producer mentors a beautiful young girl and helps her to become a big Broadway star. In time the two fall in love and decide to wed. En route to a justice of the peace, tragedy strikes the happy couple and the would-be groom ends up permanently paralyzed. Still, his girl remains devoted to him and the marriage proceeds. Nine years pass and the woman decides she wants to adopt a child. All things seem to be in place for the adoption, but a widower shows up to claim the child. The wife and the widower begin an affair soon after meeting. When the husband finds out, he selflessly executes his final option to ensure his wife's future happiness.

Cast 
 Frieda Inescort'' as Linda Marsh
 Otto Kruger as Julian Forbes
 Adrienne Ames as Susan
 Donald Douglas as Brewster
 Jane Darwell as Sophie
 J. M. Kerrigan as Timothy
 Leonard Carey as Butler
 Sarah Padden as Sister Theodosia
 Ferris Taylor as Weber
 Willard Parker as Lansdowne
 Landers Stevens as Doctor
 Ann E. Todd as Beth

References

External links 

 
 
 
 
 

1939 films
1939 drama films
1930s English-language films
Adultery in films
American black-and-white films
Films directed by Sidney Salkow
Republic Pictures films
American drama films
Films produced by Sol C. Siegel
Films scored by Paul Sawtell
Films with screenplays by Garrett Fort
1930s American films